Golshan County is in Sistan and Baluchestan province, Iran. The capital of the county is the city of Jaleq. At the 2006 census, the region's population (as Jaleq District of Saravan County) was 23,211 in 4,441 households. The following census in 2011 counted 28,584 people in 6,249 households. At the 2016 census, the district's population was 36,351 in 9,685 households. It was separated from the county on 17 January 2019 to form Golshan County.

Administrative divisions

The population history of Golshan County's administrative divisions (as Jaleq District of Saravan County) over three consecutive censuses is shown in the following table.

References

Counties of Sistan and Baluchestan Province

fa:شهرستان گلشن